Elsinoë batatas is a species of fungus in the Elsinoaceae family. It is a plant pathogen that affects members of the genus Ipomoea, including the sweet potato. The species was originally described in 1931 as a species of Sphaceloma, and in 1943 was transferred to Elsinoë by Ahmés Pinto Viégas and Anna Eliza Jenkins.

References

Fungi described in 1931
Elsinoë
Fungal plant pathogens and diseases
Root vegetable diseases